St. Joseph's Primary School is an all-girls primary (elementary) school located at Howe Street in Freetown, Sierra Leone. The school was founded in 1866 by the Sisters of St. Joseph of Cluny, Roman Catholic nuns from Italy, France and Ireland. It is the oldest girls' primary school in Sierra Leone and one of the oldest elementary schools in Africa. Typically, the school enrols girls aged from 3 to 12.

Background 
It was originally established as two sister institutions, St. Mary's Primary School and St. Anne's Primary School, which in 1985 were amalgamated to form St. Joseph's. The school is currently situated at Howe Street, Freetown, in the same compound that used to house its secondary school, now known as St. Joseph's Secondary School and formerly known as St. Joseph's Convent in Freetown. Its brother school is St. Edward's Primary School.

Past headteachers
 Mrs Gilpin

House system
The school is divided into several houses, named after the original houses of its predecessor schools, St. Mary's and St. Anne's.

Martha - [Red]
Column - [Blue]
Patricks - [Green]
Leo - [Yellow]
St. Joseph's - [Pink]
St. Theresa - [Brown]
Our Lady - [White]

Notable alumni
 Bertha Conton
 Agnes Taylor-Lewis - first female Minister of Health in Sierra Leone

References

1866 establishments in Sierra Leone
Catholic schools in Sierra Leone
Educational institutions established in 1866
Primary schools in Sierra Leone
Schools in Freetown